The 1965 Syracuse Orangemen football team represented Syracuse University in the 1965 NCAA University Division football season. The Orangemen were led by 17th-year head coach Ben Schwartzwalder and played their home games at Archbold Stadium in Syracuse, New York. Syracuse finished the regular season with a record of 7–3 and ranked 19th in the Coaches Poll. They were not invited to a bowl game.

Schedule

References

Syracuse
Syracuse Orange football seasons
Syracuse Orangemen football